Hero is a given name of Ancient Greek origin meaning "hero." When occurring in English discussions of classical literature, it is sometimes transliterated as Hērō (Ancient Greek: Ἡρώ). The Ancient Greeks pronounced this name along the lines of /he.roː/ while present-day English speakers pronounce it /ˈhi.ɹoʊ/. The modern Greek pronunciation of the name is /i.ˈro/ (Iro).

In literature, female characters named Hero include one of the titular star-crossed lovers of the Ancient Greek myth Hero and Leander, a wronged bride-to-be in William Shakespeare's 1599 comedy Much Ado About Nothing, and the protagonist of Georgette Heyer's 1944 Regency romance novel Friday's Child.

The classical masculine counterpart of the name Hero, Heron (Ἥρων), is associated with historical figures such as the mathematicians Heron the Elder and Heron the Younger. Modern authors frequently refer to these figures as Hero, however, making no distinction between the classical feminine form and masculine form of the name.

The name Hero has historically been entirely feminine, however in recent years it has seen occasional use for both boys and girls in the English-speaking world. In the United States, the name was given to six newborn girls and 22 newborn boys in 2010 and to 12 newborn girls and 15 newborn boys in 2011. It is also in occasional use in other English-speaking countries, including the United Kingdom.

Hiro, a Japanese name with multiple meanings that became more widely known following the appearance of Hiro Nakamura, a character on the 2006-2010 American television series Heroes, was given to 23 newborn American boys in 2010 and to 20 American boys in 2011. The Japanese male character's first name was intended as a play on the English word "hero".

People with the name
Modern-day people with the given name Hero include:

Hero Angeles (born 1984), a Filipino actor
Hero Brinkman (born 1964), Dutch politician
Hero Fiennes Tiffin (born 1997), English actor and model
Hero Schomerus (1816–1856), a Dutch military and colonial administrator

See also
Hero (disambiguation) for people with the mononym, fictional characters, and uses in mythology
Herro, given name and surname

Notes

English feminine given names
Greek feminine given names
Unisex given names